The Khalsa Diwan Society Vancouver (Gurmukhi: ਖ਼ਾਲਸਾ ਦਿਵਾਨ ਸੋਸਾਇਟੀ ਵੈਨਕੂਵਰ Khālsā Divān Sosāiṭī Vainkūvar) is a Sikh society based at a gurdwara in Vancouver, British Columbia, Canada. It was the largest gurdwara in North America. A gurdwara (or), meaning "the doorway to the Guru", is the Sikh place of worship and may be referred to as a Sikh temple.

It is the oldest Sikh society in Greater Vancouver. The current gurdwara is at the intersection of Southwest Marine Drive and Ross Street, in South Vancouver.

History 

The Khalsa Diwan Society was founded on July 22, 1906 and was registered on March 13, 1909. The corporate name was "The Khalsa Diwan Society". Their first site and gurdwara was built in 1908 at 1866 West 2nd Avenue. It was inaugurated on January 19, 1908. The financial situation of the society depended on the number of Sikhs living in British Columbia. Donations rose considerably as more Sikhs came to British Columbia. The population of Sikhs rose in the period of 1904–1908, the population being 5,185. It fell to 2,342 in 1911. The Sikh population dwindled even more, to 1,099, as the year 1918 approached. Verne A. Dusenbery, the author of "Canadian Ideology and Public Policy: The Impact on Vancouver Sikh Ethnic and Religious Adaptation," wrote that the gurdwara served as "truly a religious, social, political, cultural, and social service center for the entire South-Asian immigrant population of the lower mainland" during its early history.

In the 1940s the KDS served in a leadership role as Indo-Canadians asked for voting rights, and it did so in a secular capacity. The KDS had a secular role as a community centre and also served Hindus and Muslims among the Indo-Canadians. Raj Hans Kumar, author of "Gurdwara as a Cultural Site of Punjabi Community in British Columbia, 1905 – 1965," stated that in political affairs the KDS represented all "Hindus", which at the time meant all people of East Indian origin.

In the early 1950s, a serious split occurred in the Canadian Sikh community, when the Khalsa Diwan Society elected a clean-shaven Sikh to serve on its management committee. Although most of the early Sikh immigrants to Canada were non-Khalsa, and a majority of the members of the society were clean-shaven non-Khalsa Sikhs, a faction objected to the election of a non-Khalsa to the management committee. The factions in Vancouver and Victoria broke away from the Khalsa Diwan Society, and established their own gurdwara society called Akali Singh. The Akali Singh Society opened in 1952.

By the late 1950s there were plans to establish Punjabi language students for Canadian-born children and to collect funds for a new community centre. In 1963 the society began planning for a new gurdwara and community centre. The society decided to build a new gurdwara in 1969. The society purchased  of city land in 1968. Construction was completed in the first week of April 1970 for a price of $6,060. Sri Guru Granth Sahib was moved from the 2nd Avenue gurdwara to the Ross Street gurdwara on Vasakhi Day 1970. The initial plans asked for a library and community centre, but these aspects were eliminated from the plans. Construction happened from winter 1969, to April 1970. The celebration for Guru Nanak's 500th birthday was held prior to the grand opening in 1970. The building is intended to look like a lotus rising from water. To get inspiration for the style, the architect, Arthur Erickson, traveled to Agra and Amritsar.

In 1979 the annual income of the KDS was $300,000. That year the leadership of the gurdwara changed. Previously the KDS was controlled by Marxist Sikhs who did not practice Sikhism. The membership had been around 5,000 prior to 1979, as there was a $12 membership fee. Membership increased after the elimination of the fee. According to Kamala Elizabeth Nayar, in 1984 the pro-Khalistan organization World Sikh Organization (WSO) began controlling the gurdwara. According to Hugh Johnston, Vancouver Sikhs stated that the political bloc that took charge of the KDS Gurdwara network by 1979 consisted of about 10-15 families.

Vancouver Gurdwara
The original Vancouver gurdwara had a homeless shelter and a langar or kitchen. It served as a social centre for the community.

Khalsa Diwan Road 

As part of an initiative by Vancouver City Council to commemorate prominent members of the community, Ross Street was alternatively named Khalsa Diwan Road in 2018. Additional street signs marking it as Khalsa Diwan Road were added at from the Gurdwara at SW Marine Drive to 57th Avenue in 2019.

Branches
In the 1960s, the main gurdwara was in Vancouver and the branch gurdwaras were in New Westminster, Abbotsford, Victoria, and Port Alberni. By 1973, the cities with KDS temples were Abbotsford, Mesachie Lake, New Westminster, Paldi, Port Alberni, and Vancouver. However the New Westminster Khalsa Diwan became its own Sikh society the following year. In 1975 the Khalsa Diwan Society of Abbotsford also separated, as the title of the Abbotsford gurdwara was transferred to the separated entity. The Abbotsford Sikhs wanted to have local control over their gurdwara, the Gur Sikh Temple.

Events
Every March, a celebration of the martyrdom of Mewa Singh Lopoke is held. Sikhs from California go to the KDS to celebrate the event.

First executive committee 
The first executive committee of the Khalsa Diwan Society were members from 1907–1909. They included:

See also
List of places of worship in the Lower Mainland
Sikhism in Greater Vancouver
Indo-Canadians in Greater Vancouver

References
 Dusenbery, Verne A. 1981. "Canadian Ideology and Public Policy: The Impact on Vancouver Sikh Ethnic and Religious Adaptation". In Canadian Ethnic Studies, Vol. 13: 3, Winter. 
 Hans, Raj Kumar. 2003. "Gurdwara as a Cultural Site of Punjabi Community in British Columbia, 1905 – 1965." In Fractured Identity: The Indian Diaspora in Canada, Sushma J. Varma & Radhika Seshan (eds.). Jaipur: Rawat Publications. 
 Johnston, Hugh. 1988. "The Development of Punjabi Community in Vancouver since 1961". In Canadian Ethnic Studies, Vol. 20:2.
 Nayar, Kamala Elizabeth, "Misunderstood in the Diaspora: The Experience of Orthodox Sikhs in Vancouver." Sikh Formations 4, No. 1 2008), p. 17-32. - 
 Nayar, Kamala Elizabeth. "The Making of Sikh Space: The Role of the Gurdwara" (Chapter 2). In: DeVries, Larry, Don Baker, and Dan Overmyer. Asian Religions in British Columbia (Asian Religions and Society Series). UBC Press, January 1, 2011. , 9780774859424. Start: p. 43.

External links 
 Khalsa Diwan Society official website

Notes

Gurdwaras in Canada
Sikh places
Organizations based in Vancouver
Sikh organisations
1906 establishments in British Columbia